The Divisional B Femenina is the second division of women's football in Uruguay, and is organized by the Uruguayan Football Association since 2016, from a FIFA request.

Champions 
The Divisional B organized by the Uruguayan Football Association began to dispute in 2016.

Titles by club

See also 
 Uruguay women's national football team
 Copa Libertadores de Fútbol Femenino
 Uruguayan football league system

References

External links 
 Fútbol Femenino en la Página oficial de la AUF
 Campeonato Uruguayo Femenino en RSSSF 
 Campeonato Femenino B

Women
Uruguay
Sports leagues established in 2016
2016 establishments in Uruguay
Women's football in Uruguay
Women's sports leagues in Uruguay